American Parliament is a name given to the legislature of the federal government of the United States of America.

American Parliament may also refer to:

 Central American Parliament, a political institution of the Central American Integration System
 South American Parliament, a proposed body of the Union of South American Nations
 Latin American Parliament, a regional, permanent organization composed by the countries of Latin America and the Caribbean